Germán Puentes Alcañiz (born 18 December 1972) is a former professional tennis player from Spain.

Career
Puentes was the runner-up in the 1989 Spanish Junior Championships.

The Spaniard appeared in the main singles draw of five Grand Slams during his career but only once made the second round, at the 2001 Wimbledon Championships, with a win over Mariano Puerta. He also won just one Grand Slam doubles match, which was against South Africans Jeff Coetzee and Marcos Ondruska in the 2001 Australian Open, partnering Juan Balcells.

His best singles showing on the ATP Tour came at Prague in 1999 when he reached the semi-finals and he was also a quarter-finalist in the Swedish Open that year and again in the 2001 Grand Prix Hassan II.

As a doubles player he teamed up with countryman Eduardo Nicolás to make the semi-final stage of the 1999 Swedish Open. That effort was matched in the 2001 Mexican Open with Albert Portas. The pair also had a win that year over the fifth seeds in the 2001 Hamburg Masters, Wayne Ferreira and Yevgeny Kafelnikov, although it was due to a first set retirement.

Challenger titles

Singles: (4)

Doubles: (10)

References

External links
 
 

1972 births
Living people
Spanish male tennis players
Tennis players from Barcelona